Maxwell Township may refer to the following townships in the United States:

 Maxwell Township, Sangamon County, Illinois
 Maxwell Township, Lac qui Parle County, Minnesota